Sefiddar Goleh (also Romanized as Sefīddār Goleh and Sefīdār Goleh) is a village in Rastupey Rural District, in the Central District of Savadkuh County, Mazandaran Province, Iran. At the 2006 census, its population was 96, in 38 families.

References 

Populated places in Savadkuh County